Jackson's theorem may refer to:

 Jackson networks, in queueing theory (after James R. Jackson)
 Jackson's inequality, in analysis (after Dunham Jackson)